Tibar Bay Port is a container seaport at Tibar Bay, near Dili, the capital city of East Timor. It opened on 30 September 2022.

Geography

History
In June 2016, the government of East Timor signed an agreement with the Bolloré Group to build and operate a new container port at Tibar Bay. The 30-year concession contract was the first public-private partnership ever undertaken in East Timor.

The greenfield project was intended to replace the existing, capacity-strained and congestion-ridden container handling facilities at the Port of Dili. The new port was planned to be a modern container port able to handle up to 350,000 TEU annually. 

Subsequently, Bolloré Group contracted with China Harbour Engineering Company to construct the new port.

Construction was declared to be underway in June 2017 and August 2018, and was originally scheduled to be completed by the end of 2020. However, issues with funding and subcontracting delayed progress. The official ceremony launching the project was not held until 15 July 2019, and construction actually began the following month.

As of the end of 2021, the port works were 72% complete, and construction was expected to be finished in May 2022.

On 21 September 2022, the government announced that the port would come into operation on 30 September 2022. Operations were inaugurated on the opening day with the arrival of the vessels Selatan Damai and Meratus Pematangsiantar.

Facilities
The port consists of a  wharf with a  draft, and a  container yard. It has a capacity for one million container shipments a year.  Its equipment includes two ship-to-shore (STS) gantries, four rubber-tyred gantries (RTGs), 10 terminal tractors and 16 trailers.

See also
 Transport in East Timor
 Port of Dili

References

Further reading

External links 

Ports and harbours of East Timor